Jeroham ( Yərōḥām) is a name which means "cherished" or "one who finds mercy". A number of people with this name are mentioned in the Hebrew Bible:

The Father of Elkanah, and grandfather of the prophet Samuel — in 1 Samuel 1:1. 
The father of Azareel, the "captain" of the tribe of Dan — in 1 Chronicles 27:22.
A Benjamite mentioned in 1 Chronicles 12:7 and 1 Chronicles 9:12. 
The father of Azariah, one of the "commanders of the hundreds" who formed part of Jehoiada's campaign to restore the kingship to Joash in 
A priest mentioned in 1 Chronicles 9:12; (perhaps the same as in Nehemiah 11:12).

The modern city of Yeruham, Israel bears the Modern Hebrew equivalent of the name.

References

Set index articles on Hebrew Bible people
Books of Samuel people
Books of Chronicles people
Samuel
Tribe of Dan